The Farm is a historic farmhouse and the official residence of the Speaker of the House of Commons of Canada. It is located in Gatineau Park in the community of Kingsmere, Quebec, Canada; near the country's capital, Ottawa.  The Farm has been managed and maintained by the National Capital Commission since 1986. In addition to the Farm, the Speaker of the House of Commons is also provided a two-room apartment in Centre Block on Parliament Hill. The residence and its  of grounds are not open to the public.

History

The residence was originally part of a farmstead built by settler Henry Fleury in the mid-19th century. William Lyon Mackenzie King, the 10th Prime Minister of Canada, privately purchased the farmstead in 1927 to incorporate it into his country estate at Kingsmere Lake. King had the house renovated in 1935 to serve as a summer home, building two new wings as well as adding heating and indoor plumbing systems.

Upon his retirement from politics King spent more time at the Farm and it was where he died on July 22, 1950. In his will he bequeathed his entire country estate "to the government and people of Canada" and expressed a desire for the residence to be used by future prime ministers. The grounds of the Mackenzie King Estate were absorbed into Gatineau Park, however 24 Sussex Drive had already been designated the official residence of the Prime Minister of Canada so the Farm was instead designated as the residence for the Speaker of the House of Commons in 1955.

References

External links

 

Farm, The
National Capital Commission
Farm, The
Farm, The
William Lyon Mackenzie King
Estate gardens in Canada
Heritage sites in Outaouais
Farmhouses
Houses in Quebec
Houses completed in the 19th century